Football at the 1966 Asian Games was held in Bangkok, Thailand from 10 to 20 December 1966.

Medalists

Squads

Results

Preliminary round

Group A

Group B

Group C

Quarterfinals

Group A

Group B

Knockout round

Semifinals

Bronze medal match

Gold medal match

Final standing

References

 RSSSF

 
1966 Asian Games events
1966
Asian Games
1966 Asian Games